Santangpu Town is an urban town in Shuangfeng County, Hunan Province, People's Republic of China.

Administrative division
The town is divided into 50 villages and 5 communities, the following areas: 

  Xiangyang Community
  Xinyang Community
  Xinchao Community
  Xinjing Community
  Gaomuchong Community
  Gaofeng Village
  Changtian Village
  Huanghe Village
  Changchong Village
  Matijing Village
  Mangdanshi Village
  Fengshushan Village
  Shengyun Village
  Shipaishang Village
  Shibianqiao Village
  Bawan Village
  Jiazitang Village
  Shanchong Village
  Guangchong Village
  Zhengchong Village
  Fengmu Village
  Liu Village
  Daming Village
  Damachong Village
  Liujie Village
  Jiufangtou Village
  Liangtoutang Village
  Pingfeng Village
  Donghe Village
  Tantouwan Village
  Xinrong Village
  Chachong Village
  Dongsheng Village
  Jigongtang Village
  Dongfang Village
  Changjiang Village
  Sanxing Village
  Dafeng Village
  Santang Village
  Huoche Village
  Taosha Village
  Jihui Village
  Dayun Village
  Luotang Village
  Xiangsi Village
  Jinqiao Village
  Zhemu Village
  Songshan Village
  Xinjiang Village
  Huangzhou Village
  Chaoyang Village
  Huchong Village
  Xintian Village
  Huashang Village
  Yanquan Village

External links

Divisions of Shuangfeng County